The 22nd Annual American Music Awards were held on January 30, 1995, at the Shrine Auditorium, in Los Angeles, California. The awards recognized the most popular artists and albums from the year 1994.

Performances

Notes
  "Tutti Frutti"'s 40th anniversary celebration.
  Choreography and direction.
  Broadcast live from London.
  "We Are the World"'s 10th anniversary celebration.

Winners and nominees

References
 http://www.rockonthenet.com/archive/1995/amas.htm

1995